Loud Speaker is a play by American playwright John Howard Lawson. It was first produced by the New Playwrights' Theatre at the 52nd Street Theatre in New York, opening on March 2 1927. Harry Wagstaff Gribble directed, Mordecai Gorelik designed the sets, Eugene L. Berton composed its music, and Leonard Sillman choreographed its dances.

Characters
 Harry U. Collins 	
 Peterson
 Emma Collins 	
 Maid 	
 Clare Collins
 Josephus 	
 Johnnie Dunne
 Floradora Finnigan
 A Stranger with a Beard 	
 Dorothy Dunne
 Armenian Iky
 1st Reporter
 2nd Reporter 	
 3rd Reporter
 1st Photographer 	
 2nd Photographer
 The Harlem Committee
 The Imperial Serenaders

Sources
 Lawson, John Howard. 1927. Loud Speaker: A Farce. New York: The Macaulay Company.

External links
 Full text of Loud Speaker at HathiTrust Digital Library
 

1927 plays
Broadway plays
Plays by John Howard Lawson
Modernist theatre